Alpiq is a leading energy company in Switzerland and the largest energy service provider with focus on European markets. The company operates mainly in Switzerland, but it also has power stations in Italy, France, Norway, Hungary and the Czech Republic and building new ones in Germany, Italy, France, Bulgaria and the Czech Republic. The group was  established in 2009 in Neuchâtel, Switzerland after the merger of two Swiss energy companies Aare-Tessin Ltd. for Electricity (Atel) and Energie Ouest Suisse (EOS).

History
Alpiq was founded in 2009 as a result of the merger of Swiss energy companies Atel and EOS. Atel (Aare-Tessin Ltd. for Electricity) was founded in 1894 and was active in Europe in the production, trading and sale of electricity. EOS (Energie Ouest Suisse) was founded in 1919 by several electricity companies based in Western Switzerland. The company was specialised in producing electric power from hydroelectric sources and owned many stations in the country. It also had a  energy distribution network in the same area.

Group companies
The Alpiq Group comprises the following companies:

Switzerland

Alpiq
Alpiq Holding
Alpiq Suisse
Alpiq Central Europe
Alpiq EcoPower Switzerland
Alpiq EcoServices
Alpiq EnerTrans
Alpiq Hydro Aare
Alpiq Hydro Ticino
Alpiq InTec
Alpiq Prozessautomation
Società Elettrica Sopracenerina

Czech Republic

Alpiq Energy SE
Alpiq Generation
Alpiq Retail CZ

Denmark
Alpiq Denmark

France
Alpiq Energie France
Alpiq Retail France

Germany

Alpiq Energie Deutschland
Alpiq Anlagentechnik

Greece
Alpiq Energy Hellas

Hungary

Alpiq Csepel
Alpiq Energy

Italy

Alpiq Energia Italia
Alpiq Produzione Italia

Norway
Alpiq Norway

Poland
Alpiq Energy

Romania
Alpiq RomIndustries

Spain
Alpiq Energía España

Activity
Alpiq is specialised in the production, distribution and trading of electric power. The company owns around 6,322 MW in hydroelectric, thermal, wind and solar power stations. Alpiq has stakes in 2,963 MW of hydroelectric power stations, 3,250 MW of thermal power stations and 109 MW in small hydroelectric power stations, wind farms and solar power stations.

Hydroelectric power stations
The company partially or fully owns around 2,963 MW of hydroelectric power station in Switzerland and Italy. The largest hydroelectric power station fully owned by Alpiq is the Lucendro hydroelectric power station located in Switzerland that has an installed capacity of 60 MW. The company also owns a 60% stake in the Grande Dixence SA, company that manages the Grande Dixence Dam.

Thermal power stations
The company partially or fully owns around 3,250 MW of thermal power stations in Switzerland, Germany, Hungary, Italy, Spain and the Czech Republic. The largest thermal power station fully owned by Alpiq is the Plana del Vent thermal power station located in Spain that has an installed capacity of 800 MW.

Other power stations
Alpiq partially or fully owns around 109 MW of small hydropower stations, wind farms and solar power stations in Switzerland, Italy, Norway and Bulgaria. The company owns stakes in 11 small hydropower stations in Switzerland, Italy and Norway with a combined electric power generation capacity of 20.63 MW and an annual power generation of 72.17 GWh. The company owns stakes in five wind farms located in Switzerland and Italy with a combined electric power generation capacity of 178 MW and an annual power generation of 346 GWh. Alpiq is also involved in the construction of another two wind farms in Italy and Bulgaria with a combined capacity of 90 MW.

The company is also involved in the construction of the Narbone Serre solar park located near Agrigento in Sicily, Italy. The power station will use thin-film solar cells. The solar cells will have a combined capacity of 14 MW. The first section of the solar farm will go operational in 2010, generating 6.5 MW. The second section rated at 7.5 MW is still at the approvals phase.

Electricity trading
Alpiq has trading branches in 16 countries in Europe and is active on all major European energy exchanges. The company focuses on origination and sales activities in the B2B customer segment for electricity and natural gas. Alpiq has a pan-European presence with regional roots and know-how and has an experienced team in the optimization and marketing of renewable energies and flexible production units. With the 24/7 intraday team, Alpiq customers have access to the intraday, spot and forward markets around the clock in Europe. This service opens up attractive revenue potentials, supports the risk management and the active management of energy positions.

In 2008 the company bought two leading Romanian electricity trading companies Buzmann Industries and Ehol Distribution, both companies based in Bucharest. In 2010 Alpiq became the largest open market electric power trader in Romania surpassing Alro Slatina and having a 16% market share.

See also
Official site

References

Electric power companies of Switzerland
Companies based in Zug
Energy companies established in 2009
Swiss companies established in 2009